Scoparia graeca is a species of moth in the family Crambidae. It is found in Greece.

References

Moths described in 2005
Scorparia
Moths of Europe